Acta Neurologica Scandinavica is a peer-reviewed medical journal specializing in neurology published by Wiley-Blackwell. The editor-in-chief is Elinor Ben-Menachem.

According to the Journal Citation Reports, the journal has a 2021 impact factor of 3.915.

References

External links

See also
 List of medical journals

Neurology journals
Publications established in 1925
Wiley-Blackwell academic journals
Monthly journals